The 2013–14 OHL season was the 34th season of the Ontario Hockey League. The Brampton Battalion relocated to North Bay and became the North Bay Battalion, playing at the North Bay Memorial Gardens. The first two outdoor games in OHL history were held this season, when the Saginaw Spirit, Windsor Spitfires, Plymouth Whalers, and London Knights played at Comerica Park in Detroit, Michigan as part of the Hockeytown Winter Festival on December 29. On March 11, 2014 Terry Trafford of the Saginaw Spirit, who had been missing for eight days, was found dead in his vehicle at a Wal-Mart in Saginaw, Michigan.  His death was ruled a suicide as a result of self-inflicted asphyxiation. Twenty teams played 68 games each according to the regular season schedule, from September 19, 2013 to March 17, 2014. The Guelph Storm won the J. Ross Robertson Cup for the third time in franchise history, and the first time since 2004, as they defeated the North Bay Battalion in five games, and represented the OHL at the 2014 Memorial Cup held at Budweiser Gardens in London, Ontario. The London Knights also qualified for the tournament as the host team.

Regular season

Final standings
Note: DIV = Division; GP = Games played; W = Wins; L = Losses; OTL = Overtime losses; SL = Shootout losses; GF = Goals for; GA = Goals against; PTS = Points; x = clinched playoff berth; y = clinched division title; z = clinched conference title

Eastern conference

Western conference

Scoring leaders
Note: GP = Games played; G = Goals; A = Assists; Pts = Points; PIM = Penalty minutes

Leading goaltenders
Note: GP = Games played; Mins = Minutes played; W = Wins; L = Losses: OTL = Overtime losses; SL = Shootout losses; GA = Goals Allowed; SO = Shutouts; GAA = Goals against average

Playoffs

Conference quarterfinals

Eastern conference quarterfinals

(1) Oshawa Generals vs. (8) Mississauga Steelheads

(2) North Bay Battalion vs. (7) Niagara IceDogs

(3) Kingston Frontenacs vs. (6) Peterborough Petes

(4) Barrie Colts vs. (5) Sudbury Wolves

Western conference quarterfinals

(1) Guelph Storm vs. (8) Plymouth Whalers

(2) Sault Ste. Marie Greyhounds vs. (7) Owen Sound Attack

(3) Erie Otters vs. (6) Saginaw Spirit

(4) London Knights vs. (5) Windsor Spitfires

Conference semifinals

Eastern conference semifinals

(1) Oshawa Generals vs. (6) Peterborough Petes

(2) North Bay Battalion vs. (4) Barrie Colts

Western conference semifinals

(1) Guelph Storm vs. (4) London Knights

(2) Sault Ste. Marie Greyhounds vs. (3) Erie Otters

Conference finals

Eastern conference finals

(1) Oshawa Generals vs. (2) North Bay Battalion

Western conference finals

(1) Guelph Storm vs. (3) Erie Otters

J. Ross Robertson Cup

(W1) Guelph Storm vs. (E2) North Bay Battalion

J. Ross Robertson Cup Champions Roster

Playoff scoring leaders
Note: GP = Games played; G = Goals; A = Assists; Pts = Points; PIM = Penalty minutes

Playoff leading goaltenders

Note: GP = Games played; Mins = Minutes played; W = Wins; L = Losses: OTL = Overtime losses; SL = Shootout losses; GA = Goals Allowed; SO = Shutouts; GAA = Goals against average

Awards

All-Star teams
The OHL All-Star Teams were selected by the OHL's General Managers.

First team
Scott Laughton, Centre, Oshawa Generals
Dane Fox, Left Wing, Erie Otters
Connor Brown, Right Wing, Erie Otters
Aaron Ekblad, Defence, Barrie Colts
Slater Koekkoek, Defence, Windsor Spitfires
Alex Nedeljkovic, Goaltender, Plymouth Whalers
D.J. Smith, Coach, Oshawa Generals

Second team
Connor McDavid, Centre, Erie Otters
Michael Dal Colle, Left Wing, Oshawa Generals
Scott Kosmachuk, Right Wing, Guelph Storm
Adam Pelech, Defence, Erie Otters
Nikita Zadorov, Defence, London Knights
Matt Murray, Goaltender, Sault Ste. Marie Greyhounds
Kris Knoblauch, Coach, Erie Otters

Third team
Sam Bennett, Centre, Kingston Frontenacs
Max Domi, Left Wing, London Knights
Nick Bapiste, Right Wing, Sudbury Wolves
Darnell Nurse, Defence, Sault Ste. Marie Greyhounds
Matt Finn, Defence, Guelph Storm
Oscar Dansk, Goaltender, Erie Otters
Scott Walker, Coach, Guelph Storm

2014 OHL Priority Selection
On April 5, 2014, the OHL conducted the 2014 Ontario Hockey League Priority Selection. The Sarnia Sting held the first overall pick in the draft, and selected Jakob Chychrun from the Toronto Jr. Canadiens of the GTHL. Chychrun was awarded the Jack Ferguson Award, awarded to the top pick in the draft.

Below are the players who were selected in the first round of the 2014 Ontario Hockey League Priority Selection.

2014 NHL Entry Draft
On June 27-28, 2014, the National Hockey League conducted the 2014 NHL Entry Draft held at the Wells Fargo Center in Philadelphia, Pennsylvania. In total, 41 players from the Ontario Hockey League were selected in the draft. Aaron Ekblad of the Barrie Colts was the first player from the OHL to be selected, as he was taken with the first overall pick by the Florida Panthers.

Below are the players selected from OHL teams at the NHL Entry Draft.

2014 CHL Import Draft
On July 2, 2014, the Canadian Hockey League conducted the 2014 CHL Import Draft, in which teams in all three CHL leagues participate in. The Sarnia Sting held the first pick in the draft by a team in the OHL, and selected Pavel Zacha from the Czech Republic with their selection.

Below are the players who were selected in the first round by Ontario Hockey League teams in the 2014 CHL Import Draft.

References

Ontario Hockey League seasons
Ohl